Sylvester Teesdale (born 12 August 1983 in Trinidad and Tobago) is a Trinidadian retired footballer.

Career
In 2012, Teesdale debuted for Trinidad and Tobago in a 10–0 win over Anguilla, scoring a goal in what would be his only appearance for his country.

References

External links
 Sylvester Teesdale at National Football Teams

Living people
Trinidad and Tobago footballers
Association football forwards
1983 births
Trinidad and Tobago international footballers